Tomiaki is a masculine Japanese given name.

Possible writings
Tomiaki can be written using different combinations of kanji characters. Some examples:

富明, "enrich, bright"
富朗, "enrich, clear"
富晃, "enrich, clear"
富章, "enrich, masculine"
富旭, "enrich, rising sun"
富亮, "enrich, clear"
富彰, "enrich, clear"
富昭, "enrich, clear"
富秋, "enrich, autumn"
富晶, "enrich, sparkle"
冨明, "enrich, bright"
冨朗, "enrich, clear"
冨晃, "enrich, clear"
冨章, "enrich, masculine"
冨旭, "enrich, rising sun"
冨亮, "enrich, clear"

The name can also be written in hiragana とみあき or katakana トミアキ.

Notable people with the name
, Japanese sport wrestler and sports official
, Japanese rower
, Japanese sculptor

Japanese masculine given names